Michele Guel is an American cybersecurity engineer. She is a Distinguished Engineer at Cisco. In early days of cybersecurity, she was an intern at NASA Ames, and was involved in Incident Response to the Morris Worm.  She spent eleven years at NASA Ames Research Center in multiple roles, and joined Cisco as a founding member of its internal security team. While at Cisco, she co-authored Security Principles for the Enterprise Architecture Practice. She is a frequent speaker on gender diversity, and is a co-founder of Cisco's Women in Cybersecurity. She is listed as a co-inventor on the patent for "Techniques for voice-based user authentication for mobile access to network services".

In 2016 she received the Anita Borg Institute Women of Vision Award for Technology Leadership. She is a National Cyber Security Award Winner. She has been recognized by SANS Institute as a "Person who made a difference" in the field of cybersecurity.

Guel has B.A. in mathematics with a minor in Cybernetic Systems, and has also completed a two-year program in Biblical Studies. She has a M.S. in Software Engineering with a concentration in cybersecurity.  She is passionate about enabling more people to enter the cybersecurity field, and is President of National Cyber Scholarship Foundation.

References 

20th-century American engineers
21st-century American engineers
Ames Research Center
Cisco people
Year of birth missing (living people)
Living people
NASA people